David J. Lewis (birth unknown – death unknown) was a Welsh professional rugby league footballer who played in the 1900s.

Playing career

International honours
David Lewis won a cap, playing , i.e. number 5, for Other Nationalities in the 9-3 victory over England at Central Park, Wigan on Tuesday 5 April 1904, in the first ever international rugby league match.

Championship appearances
David Lewis played in Oldham's victory in the Championship during the 1904–05 season.

References

External links
(archived by web.archive.org) Statistics at orl-heritagetrust.org.uk

Oldham R.L.F.C. players
Other Nationalities rugby league team players
Place of birth missing
Place of death missing
Rugby league wingers
Welsh rugby league players
Year of birth missing
Year of death missing